Poochie was a popular Mattel toy in the 1980s, a white poodle with pink ears and paws that wore a pair of purple sunglasses. An animated special featuring the character was produced by DIC Audiovisuel in 1984.

References

External links
 
 

Mattel
Fictional dogs
1980s toys
Toy animals